The Mid and East Lothian Miners' Association (MELMA) was a trade union representing coal miners in parts of the Lothian area of Scotland.

The union described itself as having been founded in 1873 under the leadership of David Moffat, but it was wound up the following year following an unsuccessful strike, Moffat having to relocate to Fife due to victimisation.

The union was re-established in 1887 by George Young and Robert Brown.  It registered in 1889, by which time it had a membership of about 2,000 workers.  In 1894, it was a founder constituent of the Scottish Miners' Federation, and it played a leading role in that year's strike of miners in Scotland.  Other major strikes took place in 1912 and 1921.

In 1945, the association was merged with other unions to form the Stirling and Lothians Area of the National Union of Mineworkers.

General Secretaries
1890: Robert Brown
1917: Joseph Young
1919: Andrew Clarke
1940: Alexander Cameron

Presidents
1889: William Shaw
1900: George Young
1912: Andrew Clarke
1918: James Ormiston

References

Mining trade unions
National Union of Mineworkers (Great Britain)
1886 establishments in Scotland
Mining in Scotland
Defunct trade unions of Scotland
Trade unions established in 1886